Callie is a given name, nickname and surname. It is an English feminine given name that is a form of Carrie and a diminutive of Caroline.

Notable people who are known by this name include the following:

People

Given name
Callie Brownson (born 1989), American football coach
Callie Crossley, American broadcast journalist and radio presenter
Callie V. Granade (born 1960), US district judge
Callie Hernandez, American actress
Callie House (1861–1928), American political activist
Callie Visagie (born 1988), South African rugby union footballer

Nickname
Carolyn Callie Khouri (born 1957), screenwriter and director
Calliope Callie Thorne (born 1969), American actress

Surname
Ashley Callie (1976–2008), South African actress
Dayton Callie (born 1946), Scottish-born American actor

Fictional characters
Callie Briggs, on the TV series SWAT Kats: The Radical Squadron
Callie Cadogan, on the TV series The 100
Callie Maggotbone, on the TV series Ugly Americans
Callie McPherson, in the novel Cut
Callie Rogers, on the American soap opera The Young and the Restless (1998-2000)
Callie Shaw, in The Hardy Boys series
Calliope Callie Torres, on the TV series Grey's Anatomy
Sheriff Callie, title character of the Disney Junior TV series Sheriff Callie's Wild West
Callie, cousin of Marie and one of the Squid Sisters from Splatoon (2015) and its sequels Splatoon 2 (2017) and Splatoon 3 (2022).
Callie Adams Foster, a main character in the American TV series The Fosters.

See also

Callie Furnace, a historic iron furnace in Virginia
René Caillié (1799-1838), French explorer
Calley, a surname
"Callie" is the common shortening of an Origins Award
Carlie

References